Stig Johansson (7 April 1924 – 14 August 2007) was a Swedish water polo player. He competed in the men's tournament at the 1952 Summer Olympics.

References

External links
 

1924 births
2007 deaths
Swedish male water polo players
Olympic water polo players of Sweden
Water polo players at the 1952 Summer Olympics
People from Borås Municipality
Sportspeople from Västra Götaland County